First Sergeant Alfred Ramsbottom was an American soldier who fought in the American Civil War. Ramsbottom received his country's highest award for bravery during combat, the Medal of Honor. Ramsbottom's medal was won for his actions in the Battle of Franklin on June 17, 1864. He was honored with the award on February 24, 1865.

Ramsbottom was born in Delaware County, Ohio.

Medal of Honor citation

See also

List of American Civil War Medal of Honor recipients: M–P

References

External links
Alfred Ransbottom Find a Grave

Year of birth unknown
Year of death unknown
American Civil War recipients of the Medal of Honor
People from Delaware County, Ohio
Union Army soldiers
United States Army Medal of Honor recipients
People of Ohio in the American Civil War